Events from the year 1524 in India.

Events
 Duarte de Menezes finishes his governorship of Portuguese India (since 1522)
 Vasco da Gama begins and end his governorship of Portuguese India (September to December)

Births
 October 5 – Rani Durgavati (died 1564)

Deaths
December 24 - Vasco da Gama, aged 55, Portuguese navigator died at Kochi.

See also

 Timeline of Indian history

References